Zimri Dinsmore Thomas (September 16, 18091892) was a Michigan politician.

Early life
Thomas was born in Rowe, Massachusetts on September 16, 1809. In 1820, Thomas moved to central New York.

Career
Thomas served as postmaster at Hamburg, New York for six years. In 1835, Thomas moved to Michigan. From 1857 to 1858, Thomas served as supervisor of Allen Township, Michigan. On November 8, 1864, Thomas was elected to the Michigan House of Representatives where he represented the Hillsdale County 1st district from January 4, 1865 to December 31, 1866. In 1866, Thomas served as justice of the peace for Hillsdale Township, Michigan alongside George W. Burchard. They were filling the vacancy left by justice Henry T. Kellogg. In 1873, Thomas served as a justice of the peace in the city of Hillsdale with C. B. Dresser. In 1877, Thomas again served as a justice of the peace for the city of Hillsdale. Thomas served as a Hillsdale County coroner from 1873 to at least 1881.

Death
Thomas died in 1892. He was interred at Oak Grove Cemetery in Hillsdale city.

References

1809 births
1892 deaths
American coroners
American justices of the peace
Burials in Michigan
County officials in Michigan
Republican Party members of the Michigan House of Representatives
New York (state) postmasters
People from Hillsdale County, Michigan
People from New York (state)
People from Rowe, Massachusetts
19th-century American judges
19th-century American politicians